Allobates mcdiarmidi (common name: McDiarmid's rocket frog) is a species of frog in the family Aromobatidae. It is endemic to the eastern slopes of the Andes in the departments of La Paz and Cochabamba, Bolivia. Its natural habitat is Yungas forest.

Taxonomy

Allobates mcdiarmidi was first described in 1992 by Robert P. Reynolds and Mercedes S. Foster. Originally, it was known as Colostethus mcdiarmidi. Its specific epithet honored herpetologist Roy W. McDiarmid.

References

mcdiarmidi
Amphibians of Bolivia
Endemic fauna of Bolivia
Taxonomy articles created by Polbot